Lavelanet (L'Avelhanet in the Languedocian dialect of Occitan) is a commune in the Ariège department in the Occitanie region in southwestern France.

Population

Its inhabitants are called Lavelanetiens.

Tour de France
In 2002 the 13th stage of the Tour de France started in  Lavelanet.

In 2008 the 12th stage of the Tour de France started in Lavelanet.

Etymology
The name of Lavelanet comes from the Latin  meaning "hazel nut".

The city is commonly called  by the locals.

Personalities
 Alix André (1909-2000), romance novelist
 Fabien Barthez, footballer
 Benoît Baby, rugby player
 Jean-Paul Banos and Jean-Marie Banos, fencers
 Perrine Laffont, mogul skier
 Daniel Lassalle, baroque trombonist

See also
Communes of the Ariège department

References

Communes of Ariège (department)
Languedoc
Ariège communes articles needing translation from French Wikipedia